Integrated Broadband Services (IBBS) provides fully integrated and cloud-based data, voice, and technical support services to broadband providers in the United States, Canada, Latin America, the Caribbean, and Brazil. It provides both residential and commercial services to broadband operators. IBBS also provides services in provisioning, diagnostics, engineering, development, network management, VoIP, and technical support services.

IBBS is a member of the National Cable Television Cooperative, American Cable Association (ACA), NEOTV, and key employees are members of the Society of Cable Telecommunications Engineers (SCTE), Society of Broadband Professionals (SCTE Europe), Women in Technology & Telecommunications (WICT), and the Cable & Telecommunications Association for Marketing (CTAM).

History
IBBS was founded in 2001 by Michael Ingram and Robert Buckfelder, both former executives at Prestige Cable. The company's corporate headquarters are located in Atlanta. It also operates a call center in Cartersville, Georgia, and offices in Lexington, Kentucky, and Vancouver, British Columbia. Pamlico Capital formed a strategic relationship with IBBS in February 2007 and is the majority shareholder of the privately held company.  Michael Gallagher is the CEO sinceJanuary 2012.

The company announced a merger with Momentum Telecom in January 2014. The FCC approved the merger in March 2014.

References

Further reading
 RedOrbit, March 3, 2008, "IBBS Named to Georgia's Top 40 Most Innovative Companies"
Momentum and IBBS Receive FCC Approval for Merger, March 10, 2014,"FCC Approval Announcement"

Companies established in 2001
Companies based in Atlanta
Broadband
Internet technology companies of the United States